Western literature, also known as European literature, is the literature written in the context of Western culture in the languages of Europe, as well as several geographically or historically related languages such as Basque and Hungarian, and is shaped by the periods in which they were conceived, with each period containing prominent western authors, poets, and pieces of literature.

The best of Western literature is considered to be the Western canon. The list of works in the Western canon varies according to the critic's opinions on Western culture and the relative importance of its defining characteristics. Different literary periods held great influence on the literature of Western and European countries, with movements and political changes impacting the prose and poetry of the period. The 16th Century is known for the creation of Renaissance literature, while the 17th century was influenced by both Baroque and Jacobean forms. The 18th century progressed into a period known as the Enlightenment Era for many western countries. This period of military and political advancement influenced the style of literature created by French, Russian and Spanish literary figures. The 19th century was known as the Romantic era, in which the style of writing was influence by the political issues of the century, and differed from the previous classicist form.

Western literature includes written works in many languages:

Albanian literature
Armenian literature
American literature
Argentine literature
Australian literature
Austrian literature
Basque literature
Belarusian literature
Belgian literature
Bosnian literature
Brazilian literature
British literature
Bulgarian literature
Canadian literature
Catalan literature
Croatian literature
Colombian literature
Cypriot literature
Czech literature
Danish literature
Dutch literature
English literature
Estonian literature
Finnish literature
French literature
Gaelic literature 
German literature
Greek literature
Ancient Greek literature
Georgian literature
Hungarian literature
Icelandic literature
Irish literature
Italian literature
 Kashubian literature
Latin literature
Latin American literature 
Latvian literature
Lithuanian literature
Macedonian literature
Maltese literature
Mexican literature
New Zealand literature
Northern Irish literature
Norwegian literature
Polish literature
Portuguese literature
Romanian literature
Russian literature
Scottish literature
Serbian literature
Slovak literature
Slovene literature
Sorbian literature
Spanish literature
Swedish literature
Swiss literature
Turkish literature
Ukrainian literature
Welsh literature
Yiddish literature

16th century

Renaissance and Reformation

England 
Medieval and early modern England was the time of reformation, in which a "Protestant aesthetic" was developed, while the Church of England attempted to separate their notoriety with the Pope and move away from the teachings of the Roman Catholic Church. Johannine literature, being "hymnic, densely troped and symbolic, structured, inspired", became the inspiration for many poets of the period. A group of poets bloomed from this reformation, the rejection of the Pope and moving away from Roman Catholic Church. Amongst these were the most significant John Donne, George Herbert and Thomas Traherne, and constituted a group of poets known as "revelatory poetics".

The narrative which grew more prominent in English literature due to this movement towards Johannine theology incorporated an increase of spiritual themes, with "supernatural forces" and an "enchantment narrative" guiding the writings of the time. Johannine theology focused on the "divine" nature of Christ and disregards the materialistic and human aspect acknowledged in Catholic texts. It has been argued that the writings of Saint John the Evangelist, which was considered an integral part of Johannine theology, coincided with Pauline theology during the early modern era to hold influence over the English literature of the time. Author Paul Cefalu claims this form of "high Christology" was seen in the writings of John Donne, when he states that the "Gospel of Saint John containes all Divinity". However, it is argued by author P. M. Oliver that the theology which was indoctrinated in the poetry of revelatory poets including John Donne was expanded on and created by the poets themselves.

Prominent forms of literature which shaped and contributed to this era of Reformation include significantly structured prose and poetry, including the Spenserian stanza; the sonnet, which is a form of poem easily distinguishable by its fourteen-line form with a structured rhyme format; and the pastoral mode, a genre of literature which is significantly attributed to English poet Edmund Spenser, who created collections of poetry which portrays an idealistic version of rural living. Spenser has been "dubbed 'the English Virgil'" due to his influence on this particular genre.

Significant texts from 16th-century early modern England were primarily religious in context and include:

 The Great Bible, edited by Myles Coverdale.
 The first Book of Common Prayer, published on January 15, 1549 after being accepted by the House of Lords. The book, due to the political and authoritative changes of the time of the reformation, attempted to provide a "compromise" between Protestant and Roman Catholic beliefs. The author of the book, Thomas Cranmer, assisted in creating a standard version of the modern English language.

Golden Age

Spain 
The Spanish Golden Age spanned over the course of the 16th century and was a time of development and acceleration in the arts and literature in Spain. This acceleration of poetry, drama and prose forms of literature was partly due to the increase in contact that Spain gained to other European nations including Italy. During this time, a prominent Spanish poet arose named Garcilaso de la Vega. He utilised literary devices seen in foreign nations within his work, and was able to, therefore, replace the stanza forms originally used in Spain with Italian meters and stanza forms. The poet was influenced by Petrarchan imagery and the works of Virgil, and was used as inspiration by subsequent poets of the time. Garcilaso integrated a variety of mythological allusions into his works, in which he took inspiration from the Italian Renaissance of the mid-16th century.

17th century 

Prose and poetic literature within western regions, most prominently in England during the early modern era, had a distinct Biblical influence which only began to be rejected during the Enlightenment period of the 18th century. European poetry during the 17th century tended to meditate on or reference the scriptures and teachings of the Bible, an example being orator George Herbert's "The Holy Scriptures (II)", in which Herbert relies heavily on biblical ligatures to create his sonnets.

Jacobean era

England 

The Jacobean period of 17th-century England gave birth to a group of metaphysic literary figures, metaphysical referring to a branch of philosophy which tries to bring meaning to and explain reality using broader and larger concepts. In order to do this, the use of literary features including conceits was common, in which the writer makes obscure comparisons in order to convey a message or persuade a point.

The term metaphysics was coined by poet John Dryden, and during 1779 its meaning was extended to represent a group of poets of the time, then called "metaphysical poets". Major poets of the time included John Donne, Andrew Marvell and George Herbert. These poets used wit and high intellectual standards while drawing from nature to reveal insights about emotion and rejected the romantic attributes of the Elizabethan period to birth a more analytical and introspective form of writing. A common literary device during the 17th century was the use of metaphysical conceits, in which the poet uses "unorthodox language" to describe a relatable concept. It is beneficial when trying to bring light to concepts that are difficult to explain with more common imagery.

John Donne was a prominent metaphysical poet of the 17th century. Donne's poetry explored the pleasures of life through strong use of conceits and emotive language. Donne adopted a more simplistic vernacular compared to the common Petrarchan diction, with imagery derived mainly from God. Donne was known for the metaphysical conceits integrated in his poetry. He used themes of religion, death and love to inspire the conceits he constructed. A famous conceit is observed in his well-known poem "The Flea" in which the flea is utilised to describe the bond between Donne and his lover, explaining how just as multiple bloods are within one flea, their bond is inseparable.

18th century

Enlightenment era 
The Enlightenment era was a time of progression which spanned over the 18th century across many western countries. Upon recent years, this time of "enlightenment" was split into two degrees of progression, both a "moderate" and "radical" form, and was observed to be less harmonious across regions in its nature than previously thought.

Literature has been produced to comment on the different versions of "Enlightenment" that spawned across Europe during the 18th century. Henry Farnham stated in his book The Enlightenment in America that the "Moderate Enlightenment […] preaches balance, order and religious compromise", whereas the "Revolutionary Enlightenment" attempted to "construct a new heaven and earth out of the destruction of the old".

Netherlands 

Significant texts which shaped this literary period include Tractatus Theologico-Politicus, an anonymously published treatise in Amsterdam in which the author, Spinoza, rejected the Jewish and Christian religions for their lack of depth in teaching. Spinoza discussed higher levels of philosophy in his treatise, which he suggested was only understood by elitists. This text is one of many during this period which attributed to the increasing "anti-religious" support during the time of Enlightenment. Although the book held great influence, other writers of the time rejected Spinoza's views, including theologian Lambert van Valthuysen.

France 
The time of enlightenment and advancement meant that both sacred and secular authors were pushing women to be at a higher level of literary knowledgeability. France was attempting to improve the education of young women and therefore have this be seen as a reflection of the advancement of society. This led to the emergence of a new genre of literature in 18th-century France of books of conduct for girls and unmarried women. Pieces by authors including Marie-Antoinette Lenoir, Louise d'Épinay and Anne-Thérèse de Lambert all shared the same role of shaping young French women to lead successful and progressive lives. However, this form of education for women during the 18th century has been observed to be more oppressive than empowering.

Spain 

The War of Spanish Succession (1701–1714) led to the French control over Spain. This influenced their cultural identity and, therefore, the Enlightenment period held an impact on Spanish literature in the 18th century. The court of Madrid during the 18th century saw an increase in influence from the French and the Italian, with literary influences derived increasingly from authors during the English Enlightenment period. English authors who are stated to hold influence on Spanish "Ilustrados" include John Locke, Edmund Burke, Edward Young and Thomas Hobbes. New takes on literature began to emerge during this time, led by poets including Ignacio de Luzán Claramunt and Gaspar Melchor de Jovellanos, who contributed greatly to the neoclassical movement of the 18th century through drama and poetic forms of literature. Only until the 20th century, however, was the Spanish Enlightenment period properly acknowledged by scholars, with past research regarding the Spanish Enlightenment period as a "time of foreign imitation".

Numerous women who contributed to the Spanish Enlightenment period include poet , author Frasquita Larrea, and poet María Gertrudis Hore.

Russia 

During the 18th century, Russia was experiencing expansions in military and geographical control, a key facet of the Enlightenment period. This is reflected in the literature of the time period. Satire and the panegyric had influenced the development of Russian literature as seen in the Russian literary figures of the time including Feofan Prokopovich, Kantemir, Derzhavin and Karamzin.

Sublime era

Spain 
Spanish literature of the 18th century, apart from being influenced by the Enlightenment period, was influenced by the literary concept of the "sublime". The "sublime" was the linkage between Spanish Neoclassical poetry and Romantic poetry prevalent during the 18th century, and was a concept of literary, rhetorical and philosophical value. Longinus described the literary devices that the sublime creates as those that allowed the reader to experience something similar to the speaker. He had created a style of language that was not used to persuade, but merely to transport the reader into the mind of the speaker.

19th century

Romantic era

Italy 

The Romantic era for literature was at its pinnacle during the 19th century and was a period which influenced western literature. Italian writers of the 19th century, including the likes of Leopardi and Alessandro Manzoni, detested being grouped into a "category" of writing. Therefore, Italy was home to many isolated literary figures, with no unambiguous meaning for the term "Romanticism" itself. This was explained in the writings of Pietro Borsieri, in which he depicted the term Romanticism as being a literary movement that was self-defined by the writers. Contrastingly, it was noted by writers of the time, including Giuseppe Acerbi, how Italian Romantics were merely mimicking the trends seen in foreign nations in a hasty way which lacked the depth of foreign writers. Authors including Ludovico di Breme,  and Giovanni Berchet did classify themselves as Romantics, however they were critiqued by others, including Gina Martegiani, who wrote in her essay "Il Romanticismo Italiano Non Esiste" of 1908 that the authors who considered themselves Romantics only created two-dimensional imitations of the works of German Romantic authors.

The poetry of the Romantic era of Italy was focused greatly on the motif of nature. Romantic poets drew inspiration from ancient Greek and Latin poetry and mythology, while poets of this time period also sought to create a sense of unity within the country with their writings.

Political disunity was prevalent in 19th-century Italy, reflected in the Risorgimento. After the Neapolitan Revolution of 1799, the term "Risorgimento" was used in the context of a movement of "national redemption" as stated by Antonio Gramsci. The one facet which held Italy together during this time of political disunity was the poetry and writings of the time period, as suggested by Berchet. The desire for freedom and the sense of "national redemption" is reflected heavily in the works of Italian Romantics, including Ugo Foscolo, who wrote the story The Last Letters of Jacopo Ortis, in which a man was forced to commit suicide due to the political persecutions of his country.

Britain 

Historical events including the European Revolution, within which the French revolution is claimed to be most significant, contributed to the development of 19th-century British Romanticism. These revolutions birthed a new genre of authors and poets who used their literature to convey their distaste for authority. This is seen in the works of poet and artist William Blake, who used primarily philosophical and biblical themes in his poetry, and Samuel Taylor Coleridge and William Wordsworth, also known as the "Lake Poets", whose literature including the Lyrical Ballads is claimed to have "marked the beginning of the Romantic Movement".

There was known to be two waves of British Romantic authors; Coleridge and Wordsworth were grouped into the first wave, while a more radical and "aggressive" second wave of authors included the likes of George Gordon Byron and Percy Bysshe Shelley. Due to the adamant aggression of Byron in his poetic works which advocated for an anti-violence revolution and world in which equality existed, a form of fictional character was born named the "Byronic hero", who is known to be rebellious in character. The Byronic hero "pervades much of his work" and Byron is considered a reflection of the character he created.

Greek and Roman mythology was prevalent in the works of British Romantic poets including Byron, Keats and Shelley. However, there were poets who rejected the notion of mythological inspiration, including Coleridge, who preferred to take inspiration from the Bible to produce significantly religious-inspired works.

British 19th-century Romanticism developed literature which focused on the "self-organisation of living beings, their growth and adaption into their environments and the creative spark that inspired the physical system to perform complex functions". There are observed close ties between medicine, a concept which was experiencing innovation during the 19th century, and Romantic English literature. British Romanticism also had influences from 13th-/16th-century Italian art as a consequence of British artists who resided in Italy during the time of Bonaparte's invasion dealing paintings to London clients from medieval to the High Renaissance Italian periods. The exposure to these artworks influenced British literature and culture during a time "when Britain was struggling to prove the value of its own visual culture". The art gave inspiration and "shaped the aesthetic" of Romantic literature for writers including the likes of author Mary Shelley. The diversity and lack of standard seen in the work of infamous Italian artists including Michelangelo and Raphael allowed Romantic writers to celebrate new forms and ways of expression. English essayist William Hazlitt articulated how the lack of restriction, and ample artistic liberty and freedom seen through the artworks of Raphael inspired poets of the Romantic era. Michelangelo's artworks, which "embodied the sublime", were reflected in the literature of Dante and Shakespeare, with constant analogies being made at the time comparing the two.

See also
Persian literature in Western culture
Oceanian literature

References

External links

Western culture
Literature by continent